Vladyslav Kaskiv  is a Ukrainian businessman and former politician. As of 2015 he was director of Ozario Holdings GmbH. He is a former Head of the State Agency for Investment and National Projects of Ukraine, and a former Ukrainian member of parliament.

Biography
Kaskiv was born on December 1, 1973 in Melnytsia-Podilska, Ternopil Oblast, Ukraine.

Since 1994 he has been known for his social and political activity in Ukraine. He has acted as an advisor to the Minister of Economy, advisor to the President, World Bank contact group member in 2001 and was a Coordinator of PORA's civic campaign, which played the key role in organizing Presidential elections in 2004 (known as the Orange Revolution).

In the 2006 Ukrainian parliamentary election Kaskiv failed to win a seat in the Ukrainian Parliament in an alliance with his PORA and the Reforms and Order Party.

In the 2007 Ukrainian parliamentary election Kaskiv was elected for the Our Ukraine–People's Self-Defense Bloc From 2007-2010 he was a People's Deputy of Ukraine.

 2009-2010 Advisor to the Prime Minister of Ukraine Yulia Tymoshenko on foreign investment; Advisor to the Minister of Energy and Coal Industry of Ukraine
 2010-2014 Head of the State Agency for Investment and National Projects of Ukraine, he was appointed by President Viktor Yanukovych
 2015- Director of Ozario Holdings GmbH

Ozario was established to invest and provide consultative services, particularly in Europe and Ukraine. It works in agriculture, real estate, alternative energy, wood-processing and finance.

Kaskiv was involved in an embezzlement scandal, centered around his time as director of the Ukraine State Investment Agency between 2010 and 2014. In March 2016, Kaskiv was declared wanted. He was suspected of having embezzled Hr 7.5. million ($279,000) from the state budget, in partnership with other individuals. Kaskiv had fled Ukraine after the 2014 Ukrainian revolution. In 2017 he was extradited from Panama in order to stand trial, though Kaskiv claimed to have traveled voluntarily.

In the 2020 Ukrainian local elections Kaskiv was elected member of the Zakarpattia Oblast Council for Opposition Platform — For Life (he was  number six on its election list).

Recognition
 Gold Medal from Slovak Government for international contribution to Democracy development (02.2005)
 Award for achievement of the Hleytsman Foundation (12.2004, USA)
 The memorial sign "Outstanding member of the Orange Revolution."
 "Person of the Year - 2005" in the category "Public Leader of the Year"

References

External links

 National projects regulator attracts nearly UAH 9 b of investment in Ukraine in 2 years, says official, Interfax
 USD 100,000 mn will be invested in National project Open World, Ukrinform
 Ukraine to build a 4G broadband network to advance national education, 4G portal
 State agency to start cooperating with three leading audit companies, Interfax
 Kaskiv: Ukraine’s road show in Europe already resulted in 5 particular agreements, Ukrinform
Invest in Ukraine, Diplomat Magazine
 Ukraine to Build LNG Terminal at Port Yuzhnyi, Kaskiv Says, Bloomberg
 Pora coordinator Vladyslav Kaskiv addresses Edmonton audiences, UkrWeekly

Sixth convocation members of the Verkhovna Rada
Ukrainian businesspeople
People from Ternopil Oblast
1973 births
Living people
Independent politicians of Our Ukraine Bloc
Opposition Platform — For Life politicians